3C  may refer to:

In astronomy:
 3C, the Third Cambridge Catalogue of Radio Sources, an astronomical reference series

In business:
 Long March 3C, a 2008 Chinese orbital rocket
 3C Records, a record label
 3C (radio), a defunct digital radio station
 Team 3C Casalinghi Jet Androni Giocattoli, a defunct Italian professional cycling team
 3C, the IATA code for defunct American airline RegionsAir
 Three-cent piece
 3C (trade association) is an American trade association.
In computing:
 Three Cs (Compulsory, Capacity, and Conflict), three categories of CPU cache misses
 3C, or Computer Control Company, Inc., a pioneering minicomputer company (1953–1966)
 Agile model: 3C (Card, Conversation, Confirmation)
 3C, an abbreviation often used in Taiwan for "computer, communication, and consumer electronics"

In genetics:
 Alpha-tubulin 3C, a human gene
 3C, or Chromosome conformation capture, a technique used in molecular biology

Substituted amphetamines (2C family analogues):
 3C-G (Ganesha) with homologues
 3C-BZ
 3C-P
 3C-E

In places:
 Stalag III-C, a German Army World War II POW camp for Allied soldiers near Alt-Drewitz

See also
C3 (disambiguation)
List of pages with prefix 3C